Vosiūnai is a village in the eastern part of Ignalina district in Lithuania. According to the 2011 census, it had 29 residents. The village is situated on the right bank of the river Dysna. The village has a wooden Blessed Virgin Mary Church (built in 1921).

Together with the neighboring Rimaldiškė, Vosiūnai is the easternmost village in Lithuania.

References

External links 

Ignalina District Municipality
Villages in Utena County